Saraydüzü is a town and district of Sinop Province in the Black Sea region of Turkey. The mayor is Hasan Peker (MHP).

References

External links
 District municipality's official website 

Populated places in Sinop Province
Districts of Sinop Province